Antonio París Sanz de Santamaría (1818–1853) was a Bogotano leader.

1818 births
1853 deaths
People from Bogotá